Lonevåg is the administrative centre of Osterøy municipality in Vestland county, Norway. There are some shops and some small industry in the village.

References

Osterøy
Villages in Vestland